Mark Boyle (born 8 May 1979), also known as The Moneyless Man, is an Irish writer best known for living without money from November 2008, and for living without modern technology since 2016. Boyle writes regularly for the British newspaper The Guardian, and has written about his experiences in a couple of books. His first book, The Moneyless Man: A Year of Freeconomic Living, was published in 2010. His fourth book, The Way Home: Tales from a life without technology, was published in 2019.
Boyle lives near Loughrea, in the west of Ireland.

Early life 
Mark Boyle grew up in Ballyshannon, County Donegal. He took a degree in Business at the Galway-Mayo Institute of Technology, before moving to Britain in 2002.

During the final year of his degree, Boyle watched the film Gandhi, about the life of Mohandas K. Gandhi. He has frequently cited this as the moment that changed his life.

Early career 
During his first six years in Britain, Boyle lived in Bristol and managed two organic food companies. In 2007, after a conversation with a friend during which they decided "money... creates a kind of disconnection between us and our actions", Boyle set up the Freeconomy Community.

Moneyless lifestyle 
A few months after creating the Freeconomy Community, Boyle set out on a two-and-a-half-year trek from Bristol to Porbandar in India, the birthplace of Gandhi. Inspired by the nonviolent salt march led in India by Gandhi in 1930, and by the woman in America known as Peace Pilgrim, he set off in January 2008, carrying no money and only a small number of possessions. However, he was forced to turn back only a month into the trip, as language barriers and difficulties in persuading people he would work for food and a place to stay halted his journey shortly after he arrived in Calais. One of his travelling companions had travellers cheques for emergencies, which allowed them to travel back to the UK. He had not planned the trip, believing it was best to let fate take its course.

Later in the same year, Boyle developed an alternative plan: to live without money entirely. After some preparatory purchases (including a solar panel and wood-burning stove), he began his first year of "moneyless living" on Buy Nothing Day 2008.

Boyle has received considerable positive and negative publicity for his moneyless lifestyle, appearing on television, radio and other media in the United Kingdom, Republic of Ireland, Australia, South Africa, United States and Russia. Much of the attention has focused on his day-to-day routine, including food, hygiene, and traditionally expensive aspects of life, such as Christmas.

Mark Boyle is one of a small number of individuals who have lived without money in recent times. These include ,  and Daniel Suelo. However, Boyle frequently reminds his readers that a moneyless life is not a new idea; indeed it is the system of money itself that is the new development, having existed for only a small fraction of humanity's c. 200,000-year existence. Other observers note that for nearly all of recorded human history (the c. 5,000 years since the invention of writing) there has been a system of money or currency in place.

Freeconomy Community 
The Freeconomy Community was created to allow people to share, moving away from exchange economies towards a pay it forward philosophy. The original www.justfortheloveofit.org site shared similarities with websites such as The Freecycle Network, Freegle and Streetbank, and in 2014 Streetbank and Freeconomy decided that "the two projects would be so much stronger if they came together" and merged.

Freeskilling 

Alongside the online component of the Freeconomy Community, several areas including Bristol and London hold Freeskilling sessions, where freeconomists take turns to pass on their skills in free one-off evening classes. Past topics have included subjects ranging from charity fundraising and anger management to bicycle maintenance, bread-making and campaigning skills.

Freeconomy Blog 
Boyle has been the primary author of the Freeconomy Blog since it was launched in 2007. Guest writers have recently included fellow moneyless people Heidemarie Schwermer, Daniel Suelo and Tomi Astikainen.

The Freeconomy Village 
Boyle is currently working with others to set up the UK's first land-based Freeconomic community. Other founding members include Shaun Chamberlin, author of The Transition Timeline (2009), and Fergus Drennan, also known as the BBC's 'Roadkill Chef'.

Works 
The Moneyless Man – Boyle's first book, The Moneyless Man: A Year of Freeconomic Living, was published in June 2010 by Oneworld Publications. The book documents his first moneyless year, including many of the practical and philosophical challenges he faced. The author's proceeds go to the Freeconomy trust, towards purchasing land for the foundation of the Freeconomy Community.
 The Moneyless Manifesto: Live well, live rich, live free – a follow-up guide to beginning your own moneyless journey, which he also offers free on his website (http://www.moneylessmanifesto.org/why-free/).
Drinking Molotov Cocktails with Gandhi – published October 2015. In this book, Boyle argues that our political and economic systems have brought us to the brink of climate catastrophe and peaceful protest is no longer enough to bring about change.
 The Way Home: Tales from a life without technology – published June 2019.
Ben Fogle: New Lives in the Wild Series 13, 2021

Quotes 
 "If we grew our own food, we wouldn't waste a third of it as we do today. If we made our own tables and chairs, we wouldn't throw them out the moment we changed the interior decor. If we had to clean our own drinking water, we probably wouldn't contaminate it."
 "The degrees of separation between the consumer and the consumed have increased so much that we're completely unaware of the levels of destruction and suffering embodied in the stuff we buy."
 "If you don't own a plasma screen TV, people think you're an extremist."
 "It was really important for me to give up bank accounts so I closed my bank accounts so there was no safety net. I think that's the key. I think if I had a safety net I would not have got the benefits that I got from it. It was the fact that I knew I was living moment to moment, day to day."

See also 
 Anarcho-primitivism
 Gift economy

References

External links 
 The Freeconomy Blog
 Moneyless man Guardian column
 Video of Mark Boyle speaking at TEDxO'Porto, June 2011

1979 births
Living people
Gandhians
Simple living advocates
The Guardian journalists
People from Ballyshannon